The 1988 Kent Cup was an invitational non-ranking snooker tournament held in Beijing from 6 to 9 April 1988.

The invited competitors were eight professionals, six Chinese and two Hong Kong amateur players. Nine hours of nationwide coverage in China led to viewing figures of 200 million. John Parrott won the tournament, defeating Martin Clark 5–1 in the final.

Main draw

References

Kent Cup (snooker)
Kent Cup
Kent Cup
Kent Cup